Santiago, officially the Municipality of Santiago, is a 4th class municipality in the province of Ilocos Sur, Philippines. According to the 2020 census, it has a population of 19,471 people.

Santiago Cove is dubbed as the "Boracay of Ilocos Sur" because of its white sands.

Etymology
The town got its name from Saint James which in Spanish means Santiago.

History

As soon the Spaniards colonized the Philippines, Spain sent missionaries to spread Christianity, on of heir purposes in their colonization. Christianity was then spread throughout the Philipiines. The Spaniards organized group's called pueblos and divided these into sitios for easier proselytization and evangelization. From then on, the pueblo built tribunals for the Spanish government and churches and converts for the missionaries to live.
Because the Muslim were the champions of Islamic religion and because they considered war as an occupation and piracy as a hobby, they raided Christian pueblos along China Seacoast of the Philippines.

In June 1578, Spain started the Moro Wars in Jolo. This aggressive act marked the beginning of a long, bloody conflict between Spaniards and the Moros. In 1602, Spain sent punitive expeditions to Zamboanga, Cotabato and other places to curb the rising tide of Moro depredations. In were built along the seacoasts from Mindanao to Luzon. Armed galleys and frigates patrolled the sea-lanes. The Moros stopped the raids for a while.
The Moros renewed their piratical forays. In 1717, they swept the Visayan Islands and attacked Aparri and Northern Luzon. According to an old resident, Moro pirates entered the pueblo known today as Santiago in their return to Jolo. Guards in the watchtowers sounded their trumpets warning all the people of the pueblo of the arrival of the pirates. The church bells also rang alarming the people that pirates are fast approaching the shore. The people rushed and got their available arms like bolos, bows and arrows and fought the pirates boldly. Sporadic battles ensued. These lasted for few hours. As the battle went on, the missionaries stations=greater which they bought with them from Spain and held it high facing the seashore praying fervently the rosary with few people, for the safety and victory of his Christian followers, The Moros ran away and fled southward in their kumpits leaving behind their dead. After the battle, a solemn mass was held in the church. The missionary told the people that due the great intercession and miraculous protection of the image of St. James the Greater from the Moro Pirates, this pueblo was saved and in his honor, this town was named Santiago (Spanish for Saint James).

Geography

Barangays
Santiago is politically subdivided into 24 barangays. These barangays are headed by elected officials: Barangay Captain, Barangay Council, whose members are called Barangay Councilors. All are elected every three years.

Climate

Demographics

In the 2020 census, Santiago had a population of 19,471.

Economy 

Santiago is the headquarters of the Ilocos Sur Electric Cooperative (ISECO), which distributes electricity to the entire province.

Government
Santiago, belonging to the second congressional district of the province of Ilocos Sur, is governed by a mayor designated as its local chief executive and by a municipal council as its legislative body in accordance with the Local Government Code. The mayor, vice mayor, and the councilors are elected directly by the people through an election which is being held every three years.

Elected officials

Gallery

References

External links

Pasyalang Ilocos Sur
Philippine Standard Geographic Code
Philippine Census Information
Local Governance Performance Management System

Municipalities of Ilocos Sur